The Colorado 250 was a race held at Colorado National Speedway between 1995 and 1997 as part of the NASCAR Craftsman Truck Series (originally SuperTruck Series presented by Craftsman). The first race, held as part of the series' inaugural season, was sponsored by Total Petroleum as the Total Petroleum 200, and saw the closest margin of victory in the history of the series as Butch Miller defeated Mike Skinner by 0.001 second.

Skinner and Ron Hornaday Jr. would win the 1996 and 1997 events; following the 1997 race, the event was moved to Pikes Peak International Raceway.

References

Former NASCAR races
 
NASCAR Truck Series races